Beach Towel (April 26, 1987 – March 21, 2009) was a Standardbred pacer who was named the 1990 American Harness Horse of the Year. He won 18 of his 23 starts with a fastest race mile of 1:50 and earnings of $2,091,860.

Background
As a yearling, Beach Towel was bought for $22,000 by Seth Rosenfeld, the 24-year-old managing partner of the New York City-based Uptown Stables. The colt was trained and driven by Ray Remmen.

Racing career
In 1989, Beach Towel won eleven of his thirteen races including the Presidential Stake, Matron Stake, and Potomac Stake and earned more than $478,000.

In July 1990, he contested the Meadowlands Pace at Meadowlands Racetrack and overcame an unfavorable draw to win by a nose from Jake And Elwood. On September 9, he lost to Jake And Elwood (who had won the Cane Pace) in the Messenger Stakes at Rosecroft Raceway.

Beach Towel started favorite for Little Brown Jug on September 20. Driven as usual by Remmen, he led from the start and won by one and a half lengths from In The Pocket in a time of 1:53.3.

In November, the colt contested the three-year-old pacer division of the Breeders Crown at the five-eighths of a mile track at Pompano Beach. He won by three lengths from In The Pocket in a time of 1:51.2, becoming the first harness racer to win more than $2 million in a single year.

He also won the Delvin Miller Adios and many other races.

Stud record
Beach Towel was also a successful sire.  Amongst his offspring was Jenna's Beach Boy who once held the record for the fastest race mile of all-time in harness racing history. Another of his offspring was Somebeachsomewhere, the 2008 Harness Horse of the Year.

In 2007, Beach Towel went into retirement at the Woodlands Stud in New Zealand. He died on March 21, 2009 following a severe attack of colic.

He was inducted into the Harness Racing Hall of Fame in 2005.

Pedigree

References

1987 racehorse births
2009 racehorse deaths
American Standardbred racehorses
American Champion harness horses
Little Brown Jug winners
United States Harness Racing Hall of Fame inductees